Lyces flavissima is a moth of the family Notodontidae first described by Francis Walker in 1854. It is found from eastern Ecuador to the Guianas.

Larvae have been reared on Passiflora ambigua.

External links
Species page at Tree of Life Web Project

Notodontidae
Moths described in 1854